Cyclominae is a subfamily of weevils.

Tribes 
From Oberprieler (2010)
 Amycterini
 Aterpini
 Cyclomini
 Dichotrachelini
 Hipporhinini
 Listroderini
 Notiomimetini
 Rhythirrinini

References